Gateley is a surname. Notable people with the surname include:

Liz Gateley, American television producer
Michael Gateley (1904–?), Indian field hockey player

See also
 Gately